This is a list of notable Malay people or notable people of Malay descent. Entries on this list are demonstrably notable by having a linked current article or reliable sources as footnotes against the name to verify they are notable and define themselves either full or partial Malay descent, whose ethnic origin lie in the Malay world.

This list also includes emigrant Malays and could be taken as a list of famous Malays.

Activists
 Anwar Fazal, consumer, environmental activist, health advocate

Beka Melayu, a Twitter' user whose promote Malay language purism.

Cakep Malayu, a Twitter's user whose promote Malay language purism.

#AlamBahasa12, a group of users of Facebook, Twitter, and Instagram that promotes many language around the world.

Astronomy
 Mazlan Othman, Malaysian astrophysicist who pioneered Malaysia's participation in Space exploration

Astronauts
 Sheikh Muszaphar Shukor The first Malaysian astronaut
 Faiz Khaleed

Business
 Nasimuddin Amin  founder, chairman and chief executive officer of the Naza Group of Malaysia.
 Syed Mokhtar Al-Bukhary founder of the Albukhary Foundation
 Halim Saad
 Saleh Sulong
 Azman Hashim
 Nazir Razak
 Abdul Wahid Omar
 Mokhzani Mahathir

Chefs
 Norman Musa, chef and restaurateur
 Chef Wan, chef
 Zamzani Abdul Wahab, chef
 Alif Fahmy, chef

Criminals
Rozman Jusoh, Malaysian convicted drug trafficker
Ahmad Muin Yaacob, Malaysian convicted murderer
Ahmad Najib Aris, Malaysian convicted murderer
Mona Fandey, Malaysian convicted murderer

Designers
 Muid Latif, graphic designer, multimedia designer
 Nor Aini Shariff, fashion designer
 Ashley Isham, fashion designer

Entertainers
 Shila Amzah, international Malaysian singer-songwriter
 Yuna, Malaysian singer
 Aliff Aziz, Singaporean singer
 Meria Aires, known as Maria, a Bruneian singer
 Jamal Abdillah, Malaysian singer
 Sudirman Arshad, Malaysian singer 
 Yasmin Ahmad, Malaysian film director, film writer, scriptwriter
 Taufik Batisah, Singaporean singer
 Zul F, Bruneian actor and singer
 Erwin Gutawa, Indonesian composer
 Eqah, Bruneian singer
 Erra Fazira, Malaysian actress and singer
 Sean Ghazi, Malaysian singer and actor
 Gita Gutawa, Indonesian singer (half-Sundanese)
 Nazril Irham, known as Ariel, Indonesian vocalist of Noah and actor
 Fauziah Latiff, Malaysian singer
 Sheila Majid, Malaysian singer
 Amy Mastura, Malaysian actress and singer
 M. Nasir, Singaporean poet, singer-songwriter, composer, producer, actor and film director
 Noorhaqmal Mohamed Noor, known as Aqmal. N, a Singaporean singer and songwriter 
 Siti Nurhaliza, Malaysian top singer
 Anuar Zain, Malaysian singer
 Aziz M. Osman, Malaysian film director
 Fasha Sandha, Malaysian actress
 P. Ramlee, Malaysian singer, actor and film director
 Aziz Sattar, Malaysian actor
 Revalina S. Temat, Indonesian actress
 Hill Zaini, Bruneian singer and actor
 Pierre Andre, Malaysian actor
 Shaheizy Sam, Malaysian actor
 Aaron Aziz, Singaporean actor
 Hisyam Hamid, Singaporean actor
 Adi Putra, Singaporean actor and singer
 Nelissa Nizam, Malaysian singer and actress
 Dhia Azrai, Malaysian actor
 Amirul Asyhwad, Malaysian actor
 Aedy Ashraf, Malaysian actor
 Adam Lee, Malaysian singer and actor
 Aeril Zafrel, Malaysian actor
 Shahz Jaszle, Malaysian actor
 Ameerul Asyraf, Malaysian actor
 Nabil Aqil, Malaysian actor
 Imran Aqil, Malaysian actor
 Mierul Aiman, Malaysian actor
 Amir Ahnaf, Malaysian actor
 Nadhir Nasar, Malaysian actor
 Fazziq Muqris, Malaysian actor
 Aniq Iffat, Malaysian singer and actor
 Naim Daniel, Malaysian singer and actor
 Fariz Isqandar, Malaysian actor
 Syahmi Irfan, Malaysian singer
 Nick Syaf, Malaysian actor
 Izz Ilham, Malaysian actor
 Firdaus Ghufran, Malaysian actor
 Eyka Farhana, Malaysian singer and actress
 Idan Aedan, Malaysian actor
 Aznie Azmi, Malaysian singer and actress
 Ayunie Rizal, Malaysian singer and actress
 Faa Zaini, Malaysian singer and actress
 Zynakal, Malaysian singer
 Yonnyboii, Malaysian singer
 Alif Satar, Malaysian singer and actor
 Ezzrin Loy, Malaysian actor and singer
 Kucaimars, Malaysian singer and actor
 Ariff Bahran, Malaysian singer and actor
 Syafiq Kyle, Malaysian actor
 Iedil Putra, Malaysian actor and TV host
 Syafie Naswip, Malaysian actor
 Ayda Jebat, Malaysian singer and actress
 Juzzthin, Malaysian actor, rapper and TV host
Aweera, Malaysian singer and actor
Nazim Othman, Malaysian actor 
Syafiq Yusof, Malaysian actor, and film director
Zizan Razak, Malaysian actor, and singer
Erry Putra, Malaysian actor and singer
Fimie Don, Malaysian rapper
Ezly Syazwan, Malaysian singer
Syafeek Ikhwan, Malaysian singer
Hazman Al-Idrus, Malaysian singer
Aznil Nawawi, Malaysian TV host singer and actor
Putri Hanan, Malaysian actress
 Aziz Harun, Bruneian singer and actor

Leaders
 Tunku Abdul Rahman, 1st Prime Minister of Malaysia
 Abdul Razak Hussein, 2nd Prime Minister of Malaysia
 Hussein Onn, 3rd Prime Minister of Malaysia
 Mahathir Mohamad, 4th and 7th Prime Minister of Malaysia
 Abdullah Ahmad Badawi, 5th Prime Minister of Malaysia
 Najib Razak, 6th Prime Minister of Malaysia
 Muhyiddin Yassin, 8th Prime Minister of Malaysia
 Ismail Sabri Yaakob, 9th Prime Minister of Malaysia
 Sultan Ma'mun Al Rashid Perkasa Alamyah, king of the Sultanate of Deli 
 Mukhriz Mahathir, Menteri Besar Of Kedah
 Nik Abdul Aziz Nik Mat, Menteri Besar of Kelantan
 Mohd Ali Rustam, Yang di-Pertua Negeri and Chief Minister of Malacca
 Adnan Yaakob, Menteri Besar of Pahang

Literary figures
 A. Samad Said, Malaysian National Literature
 Amir Muhammad
 Amir Hamzah, Indonesian national hero and poet 
 Faisal Tehrani
 Huzir Sulaiman
 Ishak Haji Muhammad, known as Pak Sako 
 Keris Mas
 Lat, creator of Kampung Boy
 Munshi Abdullah 
 Rehman Rashid
 Saharil Hasrin Sanin
 Shahnon Ahmad
 Raja Ali Haji, Indonesian historian, poet and scholar

Politicians
 Wan Azizah Wan Ismail MP for Pandan
 Anwar Ibrahim, current Opposition Leader
 Nizar Jamaluddin MLA for Sungai Rapat
 Abdul Hadi Awang MP for Marang
 Fadzil Noor, former Opposition Leader 
 Surin Pitsuwan, Thai politician
 Hatta Rajasa, Indonesian politician
 Hamzah Haz, 9th Vice President of Indonesia

Religious figures
 Abdul Somad, Indonesian Islamic preacher

Royalty
 Tuanku Sultan Otteman II, Sultanate of Deli, Indonesia
 Sultan Ma'mun Al Rashid Perkasa Alamyah, Sultanate of Deli
 Sultan Abdul Halim Muadzam Shah ibni al-Marhum Sultan Badishah, Sultan of Kedah 
 Sultan Ismail Petra, Sultan of Kelantan
 Sultan Ahmad Shah, Sultan of Pahang
 Sultan Mizan Zainal Abidin ibni al-Marhum Sultan Mahmud, Sultan of Terengganu
 Prince Azim of Brunei

Sportspeople
 Faiz Subri, Puskas Award winner
 Hafiz Hashim, former badminton player
 Roslin Hashim, former badminton player
 Jalani Sidek, former  badminton player
 Misbun Sidek, former badminton player
 Rashid Sidek, former badminton player
 Razif Sidek, former badminton player
 Fawwaz Zainuddin, badminton player
 Nur Izzuddin, badminton player
 Muhammad Haikal, badminton player
 Junaidi Arif, badminton player
 Razin Aqeef, badminton player
 Zulhairi Sahimin, badminton player
 Faris Amrin, badminton player
 Faris Zaim, badminton player
 Zulfadli Zulkiffli, badminton player
 Zulhelmi Zulkiffli, badminton player
 Muhammad Syazmil Idham Zainal Abidin, badminton player
 Ameer Amri Zainuddin, badminton player
 Muhammad Izzuddin Shamsul Muzli, badminton player
 Misbun Ramdan Misbun, badminton player
 Siti Nurshuhaini, badminton player
 Myisha Mohd Khairul, badminton player
 Subkhiddin Mohd Salleh, football referee
 Mokhtar Dahari, former footballer
 Akmal Rizal, former footballer
 Nazmi Faiz Mansor, footballer
 Wan Kuzain, footballer
 Wan Kuzri, footballer
 Sanusi Naesae, footballer
 Adam Shahril, footballer
 Syakir Rasid, footballer
 Alfi Rasid, footballer
 Safawi Rasid, footballer
 Zafuan Azeman, footballer
 Akhyar Rashid, footballer
 Syahmi Safari, footballer
 Khairulazhan Khalid, footballer
 Zahril Azri, footballer
 Faisal Halim, footballer
 Mukhairi Ajmal, footballer
 Hakim Hassan, footballer
 Zikri Khalili, footballer
 Danial Asri, footballer
 Khuzaimi Piee, footballer
 Fazly Mazlan, footballer
 Syahir Bashah, footballer
 Sharul Nazeem, footballer
 Syahmi Adib Haikal, footballer
 Aliff Izwan, footballer
 Harith Haiqal, footballer
 Aliff Haiqal, footballer
 Hadi Fayyadh, footballer
 Luqman Hakim Shamsudin, footballer
 Arif Aiman Hanapi, footballer
 Umar Hakeem, footballer
 Syahirul Fazly, footballer
 Haykal Danish, footballer
 Hakimi Mat Isa, footballer
 Sikh Izhan Nazrel, footballer
 Azim Amin, footballer
 Firdaus Irman, footballer
 Kamal Arif Azrai, footballer
 Syakimi Karim, footballer
 Firdaus Fuad, footballer
 Farris Izdiham, footballer
 Faiz Amer, footballer
 Haziq Kutty, footballer
 Adam Mukhriz, footballer
 Syukran Pauzi, footballer
 Sahil Husni, footballer
 Syaahir Saiful, footballer
 Ibrahim Manusi, footballer
 Nadzwin Salleh, footballer
 Najmudin Akmal, footballer
 Syukur Fariz, footballer
 Syamer Kutty Abba, footballer
 Adam Nor Azlin, footballer
 Nor Azam Azih, footballer
 Danial Amier Norhisham, footballer
 Haqimi Azim Rosli, footballer
 Asyraaf Omar, footballer
 Fauzan Fauzi, footballer
 Nazri Muhammad, footballer
 Tasnim Fitri, footballer
 Khairu Azrin Khazali, footballer
 Haziq Subri, footballer
 Latiff Suhaimi, footballer
 Hafiy Haikal, footballer
 Royizzat Daud, footballer
 Fandi Othman, footballer
 Syazwan Salihin, footballer
 Syazwan Andik, footballer
 Syazwan Zainon, footballer
 Ilham Amirullah, footballer
 Nik Azli, footballer
 Aqil Hilman, footballer
 Ariff Ar-Rasyid, footballer
 Asraff Aliffuddin, footballer
 Zulfahmi Skilee, footballer
 Muhammad Nor Amin, footballer
 Raoul Suhaimi, footballer
 Khairin Nadim, footballer
 Aqil Yazid, footballer
 Aizil Yazid, footballer
 Hami Syahin, footballer
 Amirul Adli, footballer
 Afiq Noor, footballer
 Shahfiq Ghani, footballer
 Safuwan Baharudin, footballer
 Shakir Hamzah, footballer
 Faris Ramli, footballer
 Iryan Fandi, footballer
 Ilhan Fandi, footballer
 Ikhsan Fandi, footballer
 Irfan Fandi, footballer
 Zulfahmi Arifin, footballer
 Zainol Gulam, footballer
 Zaiful Nizam, footballer
 Khairul Nizam, footballer
 Iqram Rifqi, footballer
 Ilhan Noor, footballer
 Sahil Suhaimi, footballer
 Hazzuwan Halim, footballer
 Adam Swandi, footballer
 Shah Shahiran, footballer
 Izwan Mahbud, footballer
 Shawal Anuar, footballer
 Syazwan Buhari, footballer
 Ryaan Sanizal, footballer
 Amirul Haikal, footballer
 Harith Kanadi, footballer
 Azlan Iskandar, squash player
 Addeen Idrakie, squash player
 Mohd Syafiq Kamal, squash player
 Mohamed Fairuz Fauzy, race car driver
 Jazeman Jaafar, race car driver
 Nazim Azman, race car driver
 Fahmi Ilyas, race car driver
 Afiq Ikhwan Yazid, race car driver
 Putera Adam Halim, race car driver
 Nabil Jeffri, race car driver
 Hafizh Syahrin, motorcycle racing
 Zulfahmi Khairuddin, motorcycle racing
 Adam Norrodin, motorcycle racing
 Khairul Idham Pawi, motorcycle racing
 Danial Syahmi, motorcycle racing
 Izam Ikmal, motorcycle racing
 Idil Fitri Mahadi, motorcycle racing
 Ramdan Rosli, motorcycle racing
 Kasma Daniel, motorcycle racing
 Zaqhwan Zaidi, motorcycle racing
 Hakim Danish, motorcycle racing
 Farres Putra, motorcycle racing
 Emil Idzhar, motorcycle racing
 Hafiza Rofa, motorcycle racing
 Hafiq Azmi, motorcycle racing
 Azlan Shah Kamaruzaman, motorcycle racing
 Ibrahim Norrodin, motorcycle racing
 Muhammad Fadhil Mohd Zonis, track cycling
 Muhammad Firdaus Mohd Zonis, track cycling
 Muhammad Shah Firdaus Sahrom, track cycling
 Azizulhasni Awang, track cycling
 Nurul Izzah Izzati Mohd Asri, track cycling
 Fandi Ahmad, former FC Groningen player and Singapore's footballing legend
 Al-Qaasimy Rahman, former footballer
 Khairuddin Ashaari, weightlifter
 Aniq Kasdan, weightlifter
 Erry Hidayat, weightlifter
 Aznil Bidin, weightlifter
 Nasir Roslan, weightlifter
 Hafiz Shamsuddin, weightlifter

Visual artists
 Ibrahim Hussein
 Yusof Ghani
 Ahmad Zakii Anwar

Warriors
 Adnan bin Saidi (1915-1942), warrior from mainland Malaya
 Syarif Masahor, warrior from Sarawak
 Dato' Bahaman, warrior from Semantan, Pahang
 Mat Kilau, warrior from Jerantut, Pahang
 Syed Zainal Abidin, warrior from Kedah
 Tunku Muhammad Saad, warrior from Kedah

References

See also
 List of Malaysians
 List of Malaysians of Chinese descent
 List of Malaysians of Indian descent

Malays